Spanish flag may refer to the flag of Spain or various species:

Gonioplectrus hispanus, a species of grouper (fish)Ipomoea lobata (plant)Lantana camara (plant)Euplagia quadripunctaria'' (moth)